In 2008, for the first time in ten years, two Grand Tours were won by one rider, the Spaniard Alberto Contador. Alessandro Ballan succeeded fellow Italian Paolo Bettini as World Champion, winning the road race in his home country, where Varese hosted the World Championships for the second time in history. Bettini and German sprinter Erik Zabel were among the most prominent riders to quit after this season, while Mario Cipollini made a brief comeback in the early months of the year.

Despite even tighter controls and warnings concerning doping, and the introduction of the blood passport by the UCI, several major races, including the Giro and Tour were faced with positive tests. In addition, the ongoing feud between the UCI and the race organizations almost came to a definite break in March, when the UCI threatened to suspend riders participating in ASO's Paris–Nice. The cycling federation's ProTour seemed bankrupt halfway through the year when all remaining licensed teams announced their withdrawal. However, at the start of 2009, 16 teams saw their ProTour license renewed and two new teams joined the elite division of cycling. Crédit Agricole and Gerolsteiner stopped sponsorship of a team, and were not succeeded by new sponsors. Other than Gerolsteiner, many German companies who participated in cycling sponsorship in recent years withdrew their financial backing after this year's latest of doping cases related to German cycling. As a result, fewer professional teams and races, among them the Deutschland Tour, will be part of the 2009 season.

Amongst professional riders, Mark Cavendish was the most successful with 17 victories, including 4 in the Tour de France and two in the Giro d'Italia. His team, Team High Road (which got a new sponsor midway through the season, ever since going by the name Team Columbia), was by far the most successful with 77 victories. Alejandro Valverde was the most successful allround rider of the year based on the CQ ranking.

After the end of the season, seven-time Tour de France winner Lance Armstrong announced his comeback to competitive road cycling for 2009, with the Astana Team.

Grand Tours

World Championships Varese

Olympic Games Beijing

Monument Classics

UCI ProTour

2.HC Category races

1.HC Category races

National Road Race Championships

National Time Trial Championships

References

See also
2008 in women's road cycling
2008 in track cycling

 
Men's road cycling by year